Hamza (also spelled as Hamzah, Hamsah, Hamzeh  or Humza; , standardized transliteration is ) is an Arabic masculine given name in the Muslim world.  It was borne by one of the Islamic prophet Muhammad's uncles, Hamza ibn Abd al-Muttalib, a wrestler and an archer who was renowned for his strength and bravery in battle. His exploits were detailed in the Hamzanama, an adventure epic written in Persian.

Given name
 Hamza (rapper), full name Hamza Al-Farissi, Belgian rapper of Moroccan descent
 Hamza Ali Abbasi, Pakistani actor, model, and film director
 Hamza Aboud (born 1984), Lebanese footballer
 Hamza Abdullah, American football safety
 Hamza Abdullahi (1945–2019), Nigerian Air Force air marshal and governor
 Hamza Abu-Ghalia (born 1980), Libyan weightlifter
 Hamza Al Khateeb (1997-2011), Syrian child tortured to death by Syrian government
 Humza Arshad, British-Pakistani actor, writer, comedian and YouTube personality
 Hamza Abdi Barre (born 1972), prime minister of Somalia
 Hamza Bencherif, footballer
 Hamza Çakir (born 1985), German footballer of Turkish descent
 Hamza Çalışkan (born 1994), Turkish Paralympian para table tennis player
 Hamza Demir (born 1956), Swedish politician
 Hamza El Din, Oud player, composer and ethnomusicologist
 Hamza Dirani, Jordanian racing driver
 Hamzah Fansuri, Sufi poet from Sumatra
 Hamza Hamzaoğlu, former Turkish footballer
 Hamzah Haz, former vice-president of Indonesia
 Prince Hamzah of Jordan, son of the late King Hussein of Jordan
 Hamza Kashgari, Saudi columnist
 Hamza Kastrioti, Ottoman military personnel
 Hamza Koudri, Algerian footballer
 Hamza ibn ‘Abd al-Muttalib, noted Sahābi and uncle of Muhammad
 Hamza Namira, Egyptian singer-songwriter, and multi-instrumentalist
 Hamza Hakimzade Niyazi, Uzbek poet
 Hamza Ruhezamihigo, Rwandan basketball player
 Hamza Shah Saifuddin, fourth Sultan of Bengal
 Hamzah Shehatta, Saudi poet
 Hamza Yassin, Sudanese-born British TV presenter
 Hamza Yerlikaya, Turkish Graeco-Roman style wrestler
 Hamza Younés, Tunisian footballer
 Humza Yousaf, Scottish politician
 Hamza Choudhury, English Footballer
 Hamzah Zainudin, Malaysian politician

Surname
 Amiruddin Hamzah, Malaysian politician
 Bur’i Mohamed Hamza, Somali politician
 Fuad Hamza, Saudi Arabian government official
 Gamal Hamza, Egyptian footballer
 Khidir Hamza, nuclear technician who worked with Saddam Hussein
 Mauro Hamza, fencing coach
 Muhammad Hamza (1929–2021), Pakistani politician
 Obaidullah Hamzah (born 1972), Bangladeshi Islamic scholar
 Tengku Amir Hamzah, Indonesian poet
 Tengku Razaleigh Hamzah, Malaysian politician
 Abdul Nasir bin Amer Hamsah, Singaporean criminal and prisoner

Derived names
 Abu Hamza

Arabic masculine given names
Bosniak masculine given names
Turkish masculine given names
Pakistani masculine given names